Bark! is a 2002 film written by Heather Morgan, directed by Katarzyna Adamik (the daughter of director Agnieszka Holland) and starring Morgan, Lee Tergesen, and Lisa Kudrow.  The film debuted at the 2002 Sundance Film Festival, where it was nominated for a Grand Jury Prize.

The "extremely low-budget" film, which had its origins in a 90-second comedy sketch, is about Lucy, a professional dogwalker (played by Morgan), who gradually assumes the identity of a dog.  Tergesen plays Peter, her embarrassed husband, and Kudrow plays their veterinarian.

Variety, reviewing the film after its Sundance screening, said it "seems to be a throwback to the craziness-as-higher-expression-of-individuality school that was in vogue between The King of Hearts and Harold and Maude, noting "Lucy's withdrawal doesn't seem to spring from anything — unless urban life's everyday rudeness and an overbearingly suburban-banal family background count — and scene by scene, Bark! builds no discernible rhythm, viewpoint or mood apart from a faint, rudderless, shaggy-joke tenor.

The film was screened at several film festivals, including the Moscow International Film Festival, the Munich Film Festival, the Warsaw International Film Festival, and the Cleveland International Film Festival, but never received a theatrical release.

The film was eventually released on DVD in 2003 by TVA International.

Cast
Lee Tergesen as Peter
Heather Morgan as Lucy
Lisa Kudrow as Darla
Vincent D'Onofrio as Malcolm
Hank Azaria as Sam
Mary Jo Deschanel as Betty
Scott Wilson as Harold
Aimee Graham as Rebecca
Wade Andrew Williams as Tom

References

External links

2002 films
American independent films
2002 comedy films
2000s English-language films
2000s American films